Grand Star (La Compagnie des Glaces in France) is a 2007 Canadian / French / Belgian co-production science fiction television series loosely based on the novel series La Compagnie des glaces by the French writer Georges-Jean Arnaud. It was filmed in Wallers-Arenberg, France, and originally broadcast on Space and A-Channel.

Set in an apocalyptic future 100 years after a cataclysmic nuclear explosion on the Moon sends the Earth into a new Ice Age, the show revolves around the interactions between a small community of survivors on Earth and the returning descendants of colonists who escaped Earth in advance of the disaster.

A multiplayer strategy game based on the TV series universe was launched in 2007. In the game, players compete by using their trains to gather money for energy source control.

Episode list
 L'immense lumière
 L'origine de Cal
 Un nouveau commandant
 NARA
 Les cobayes
 Un canon pour le soleil
 Un début de rébellion
 Détenu dans le froid
 Le prisonnier de Palidor
 L'exode
 La nouvelle station
 La tempête de la vérité
 A la recherche des rénovateurs
 Coupure de courant
 Le fugitif
 Marcus
 L'évasion
 Jonah
 Les masques blancs
 Le jugement de Zel
 Lavage de cerveau
 Une nouvelle recrue
 Les vestiges du passé
 Les rénovateurs
 La destinée de Cal
 La lumière chaude

External links
 

2000s Canadian science fiction television series
2007 Canadian television series debuts
CTV Sci-Fi Channel original programming
CTV 2 original programming
Post-apocalyptic television series